Leven railway station is a proposed railway station that will be the terminus of the Levenmouth rail link, connecting the town of Leven, Fife with the Fife Circle Line. Historically, there was a station at Leven between 1854 and 1969 on the North British Railway.

A plan to re-open the rail link and the station was approved by the Scottish Government on 8 August 2019. The £70 million project would see the station built near the town's swimming pool by 2024. Direct journeys to Edinburgh Waverley are projected to take just over an hour.

In December 2020, four options were proposed for the new station site. A decision is expected to be made in winter 2021 with construction starting the following year.

References

Disused railway stations in Fife
Former North British Railway stations
Railway stations in Great Britain opened in 1854
Railway stations in Great Britain closed in 1969
Proposed railway stations in Scotland